DIVA-GIS is a free geographic information system software program used for the analysis of geographic data, in particular point data on biodiversity. The software was first designed for application to the study of wild potatoes in South America.

Development
DIVA-GIS was developed as a joint project by the International Potato Center in Peru, the International Plant Genetic Resources Institute, the Museum of Vertebrate Zoology at the University of California at Berkeley, the Secretariat of the Pacific Community, and the FAO. DIVA-GIS has a wide range of tools for evaluation of mapping and modeling of habitats. There is a command-line version of the program that has been developed, AVID-GIS.

Formats
DIVA-GIS can process data in all standard GIS formats, including data from ESRI's ArcGIS programs. The program runs on Windows and OS X. DIVA raster files generated may be imported and exported into R or the modeling program Maxent.

References

External links

Cross-platform software
Free GIS software